Hume is a masculine given name. Notable people with the name include:

 Hume Cronyn (1911-2003), Canadian actor
 Hume Cronyn (politician) (1864-1933), Canadian politician and lawyer, father of the actor
 Hume Horan (1934–2004), American diplomat and ambassador

Masculine given names